The tenth edition of the Pan Pacific Swimming Championships, a long course (50 m) event, was held in 2006 in Victoria, British Columbia, Canada, from August 17–20. Six world records were tallied compared to one from the 2002 edition. This edition was slower than it would have been because of the lack of a full strength Australian team, one of the strongest teams in the world. This made it a common situation that swimmers in the B final were swimming fast enough to place in the top 3 since no country is allowed to have more than 2 swimmers in either final heat.

Results

Men's events

Women's events

Medal table

New records achieved

World records

Championship records

Notes and references

See also
All-time Pan Pacific Championships medal table

External links
Meet results from OmegaTiming.com
Official 2006 Pan-Pacific website
OmegaTiming.com Event results book (PDF)

 
Pan
Pan
International aquatics competitions hosted by Canada
Pan Pacific Swimming Championships
Sports competitions in Victoria, British Columbia
Swimming competitions in Canada